Directed information, is an information theory measure that quantifies the information flow from the random process   to the random process . The term directed information was coined by James Massey and is defined as
,
where  is the conditional mutual information .   

The Directed information has many applications in problems where causality plays an important role such as capacity of channel with feedback, capacity of discrete memoryless networks with feedback, gambling with causal side information, compression with causal side information, and in real-time control communication settings, statistical physics.

Estimation and optimization 
Estimating and optimizing the directed information is challenging because it has  terms where  may be large. In many cases, one is interested in optimizing the limiting average, that is, when  grows to infinity termed as a multi-letter expression.

Estimation
The estimation of directed information from given samples is a very hard problem since the directed information expression does not depends on samples but on the joint distribution   which is unknown. There exist several algorithms based on context tree weight and on empirical parametric distributions and using Long short-term memory.

Optimization
The maximization of the directed information is a fundamental problem in information theory. For a fixed sequence of channel distributions , the objective is to optimize  over the channel input distributions .

There exist algorithms for optimizing the directed information based on Blahut-Arimoto, Markov decision process, Recurrent neural network, Reinforcement learning. and Graphical methods (the Q-graphs).
For the case of Blahut-Arimoto, the main idea is to start with the last element of the directed information and go backward. For the case of Markov decision process, the main ideas is to transform the optimization into an infinite horizon average reward Markov decision process. For Recurrent neural network the main idea is to model the input distribution using the Recurrent neural network and optimize the parameters using Gradient descent. For Reinforcement learning the main idea is to solve the Markov decision process formulation of the capacity using Reinforcement learning tools which allows us to deal with a large or even continuous alphabet.

Causal conditioning
The essence of directed information is from the causal conditioning operation.
.
Note, that this is very similar to the chain rule of regular conditioinig, i.e., where the difference is in the conditioning on the sequence  versus  . One can also intruce delay to the causal conditioning, i.e., 
.

Properties
The chain rule for causal conditioning is

The casual conditioning probability is indeed a probability vector, i.e., 
.
.

Directed Information can be written in terms of causal conditioning as follows

Conservation law of information
This law, established by James Massey and his son, gives a very nice intuition to the directed information and its relation to mutual information. The law states that for any , the following equality holds:

References

Information theory